This is a list of Swedish records in swimming, as ratified by the Swedish Swimming Federation. All records were achieved in finals unless otherwise noted.

Long course (50 m)

Men

Women

Mixed relay

Short course (25 m)

Men

Women

Mixed relay

Notes

References
General
Swedish Long Course Records 2 July 2022 updated
Swedish Short Course Records 30 April 2022 updated
Specific

External links
Svenska Simförbundet official website

Sweden
Records
Swimming records
Swimming